Hope and a Little Sugar is a 2006 Indian English-language film shot in New York City and directed by Tanuja Chandra. It premiered and won an award on 6 October 2006 at the South Asian International Film Festival in New York. In addition, it was the opening film in 2008 for the Opening Night Gala at BAFTA, sponsored by the London Asian Film Festival by Tongues on Fire.

Plot
Ali (Amit Sial) is a photographer and bike messenger who lives in New York. He develops a friendship and falls in love with a married woman, Saloni Oberoi (Mahima Chaudhry). When her husband, Harry Oberoi (Vikram Chatwal), is killed during the September 11 attacks, Harry's father, a retired Colonel (Anupam Kher), begins to take his aggressions out on Ali for being a Muslim. Although Mrs. Oberoi (Suhasini Mulay) tries to stop the Colonel's behavior, the situation escalates as the Colonel, himself, becomes the target of social post-9/11 aggression directed towards him because he is a Sikh.

Cast
Anupam Kher as Colonel Oberoi
Mahima Chaudhry as Saloni Oberoi
Vikram Chatwal as Harry Oberoi
Amit Sial as Ali Siddiqui
Suhasini Mulay as Mrs. Oberoi

Production
The film was shot in 2004 but was delayed due to "an exhaustive post-production exchange" between director Chandra and independent American producers—Scott Pardo and Glenn Russow. This included pre and post-production that was entirely done via the internet. Pre-production took over two months where Chandra "finalised the cast, locations and even set design sitting in Mumbai." The entire cast and crew consisted of 25 people, and the film was shot entirely in New York over a period of 25 days.

See also
List of cultural references to the September 11 attacks

Notes

External links
 
Official Trailer - Tongues on Fire/London Asian Film Festival

2006 films
Films about Indian Americans
English-language Indian films
Films shot in New York City
Indian films set in New York City
Films based on the September 11 attacks
Films directed by Tanuja Chandra
2000s English-language films